The Chin Swee Caves Temple (Pinyin: Qīngshuǐ Yán Miào) is a Chinese temple in Genting Highlands, Pahang, Malaysia. It is situated in the most scenic site of Genting Highlands, on a 28-acre plot of rocky forested land donated by Genting Group founder the late Lim Goh Tong. Located 4,600 feet above sea level, the temple is about 5–10 minutes' drive down from the peak of the mountain. Within the temple is seated a statue of Master Qingshui, a Buddhist monk who has long been worshipped as a Deity in Fujian Province, China for his miraculous abilities to summon rain and subdue evil spirits. The temple attracts many local and foreign devotees from Singapore, Taiwan, Vietnam, China, Thailand and Indonesia.

History 

After completing the building of Genting Highlands Resort, in 1975, which at that time was just a hotel with a small casino, Lim Goh Tong began construction of the temple. The late Lim began by gathering a group of friends many of whom were from his own Anxi clan and ancestry village of Penglai in Fujian Province of China and established the Chin Swee Temple Society. Leading by example, the late Lim began a donation drive by contributing a 28-acre land for the temple's construction. His companies Resorts World Bhd and Genting Berhad made a cash donation of RM8.1 million for the building fund. The late Lim was elected as the Chairman of the society while his son, Lim Kok Thay was appointed as its Deputy Chairman.

The temple which was officially opened on 29 March 1994 by Ling Liong Sik (then the Malaysian Minister of Transport), overlooks lush green slopes of virgin forest with a view of the winding road ascending to Genting Highlands. Construction of the temple was both arduous and dangerous due to the steep and rocky terrain, which made it impossible to utilise modern machinery for fundamental work such as piling. As a result, the late Lim who acted as the planner, architect, designer, contractor and supervisor used manual labour for the digging of the foundation for the temple. He and his team manually dug holes of 80 to 100 ft in-depth for this tricky hill slope development. After all this tedious and time-consuming work the temple was completed in 18 years. Despite adopting such a manual approach in challenging situations and risky environment, there were neither casualties nor work-related accidents reported during the whole construction period.

Features 

The temple's first stage of development, costing an estimated RM12 million, comprises an imposing traditional structure. A massive statue of Buddha stands behind the building. There is originally around 10,000 blessing lamps installed for those looking to be blessed despite only 2,000 remain until today. The temple has tall red columns supporting an ornamental roof. The exterior wall carries many inscriptions that depict the Reverend Chin Swee's life and his major charitable and supernatural works. Within the temple, the statue of the Reverend Chin Swee placed per feng shui principles is seated at the northern part of the main hall with his face looking south. Behind the statue is a natural rock in a man-made flowing stream. The rock gives the necessary support to the statue while the stream provides clear cool mineral water throughout the year. This water has been named "Dragon Mineral Water" where it could heal the sick. The Reverend Chin Swee's birthday falls on the 6th day of Lunar New Year and is celebrated for ten days beginning from the first day of the Lunar New Year. Going forward and with the completion of these latest additions, the temple committee is planning for more events and celebrations aimed at depicting not only the good deeds of the Reverend Chin Swee but also the richness of the Malaysian Chinese culture.

See also 
 Awana Skyway
Qingshui Temple:, Wanhua, Taipei, Taiwan
Zushi Temple:,  New Taipei, Taiwan
Qing Shui Temple:, Zuoying, Kaohsiung, Taiwan
Snake Temple: Penang, Malaysia
Fushan Temple:, Yangon, Myanmar

References

External links 
 
 
 Former official website address

Religious buildings and structures completed in 1994
Chinese-Malaysian culture
Buddhist temples in Malaysia
Taoist temples in Malaysia
Genting Highlands
20th-century Buddhist temples
20th-century Taoist temples
Religious buildings and structures in Pahang